The First Orban cabinet was the government of Romania until 14 March 2020. It was a minority administration led by Ludovic Orban, the leader of the National Liberal Party (PNL), who received the support of a parliamentary majority on 4 November 2019 and entered office the same day. It included a confidence-and-supply agreement with the Save Romania Union (USR) and the Democratic Alliance of Hungarians in Romania (UDMR/RMDSZ), as well as other smaller parties (including, most notably, People's Movement Party or PMP for short).

On 5 February 2020, a no-confidence vote to dissolve the Orban Cabinet was adopted in Parliament with 261 votes in favour and 139 against. According to the Constitution of Romania, this cabinet continued to serve as the Government of Romania until the date the next cabinet was sworn in.

References

Orban
Orban
Orban
Orban
2020 disestablishments in Romania
2019 in Romania
2020 in Romania